David Welch may refer to:
David A. Welch (born 1960), Canadian political scientist
David Welch (diplomat) (born 1953), American diplomat
David Welch (baseball) (born 1983), baseball pitcher
David Welch (optical engineer) (born 1960), American businessman and research scientist
David Welch (historian), English historian
David E. Welch (1835–?), Wisconsin state assemblyman and senator
David Welch (New Hampshire politician) (born 1940), member of the New Hampshire House of Representatives
Dave Welch, British poker player
Dave Welch (admiral), United States Navy admiral

See also 
 Welch (surname)